Tachina calliphon is a species of fly in the genus Tachina of the family Tachinidae that is endemic to Australia.

References

Insects described in 1849
Endemic fauna of Australia
calliphon